The 2017–18 Northwestern State Demons basketball team represented Northwestern State University during the 2017–18 NCAA Division I men's basketball season. The Demons, led by 19th-year head coach Mike McConathy, played their home games at Prather Coliseum in Natchitoches, Louisiana as members of the Southland Conference. They finished the season 4–25, 1–17 in Southland play to finish in last place. They failed to qualify for the Southland tournament.

Previous season
The Demons finished the 2016–17 season 13–16, 7–11 in Southland play to finish in a five-way tie for eighth place. They failed to qualify for the Southland tournament.

Roster

Schedule and results

|-
!colspan=9 style=| Non-conference regular season

|-
!colspan=9 colspan=9 style=| Southland regular season

See also
2017–18 Northwestern State Lady Demons basketball team

References

Northwestern State
Northwestern State Demons basketball seasons
Northwestern State Demons basketball
Northwestern State Demons basketball